Victoria Margareta Sandell Svensson (born 18 May 1977) is a Swedish football manager and former player. Nicknamed Vickan, she was team captain on the Swedish women's national team and Djurgårdens IF Dam, captaining the national team during the 2007 FIFA Women's World Cup, and is one of the most merited Swedish footballers of all time. She was originally known as Victoria Svensson, and then Victoria Sandell Svensson after marrying Camilla Sandell in April 2008 and adding her surname to her own.

Career
In 1998, and again in 2003, she won the Diamantbollen, an award given to the best female player in Sweden each year. Also in 1998, 2001, and 2003 Sandell Svensson scored the most goals in the Damallsvenskan.

Sandell Svensson retired after Sweden's Euro 2009 quarter-final defeat to Norway. She had 166 caps and 68 goals.

Sandell Svensson can be seen in the Sveriges Television documentary television series The Other Sport from 2013.

Victoria has been a sporting director for Djurgården, head coach for the Sweden women's F16 national team, and most recently in 2018–2020 coach for Tyresö FF

On 6 May 2021 Victoria Sandell was presented as a new assistant coach for the women's national team.  She will assume office when the World Cup qualifiers starts in the autumn 2021. She was only contracted for 3 matches, but aims to stay longer if it works well.
Vickan will focus on individual training and performance analysis, particularly the offence.

Matches and goals scored at World Cup & Olympic tournaments

Matches and goals scored at European Championship tournaments

Honours

Club 
Älvsjö AIK FF
 Damallsvenskan (2):1998, 1999
 Svenska Cupen: 1999

 Djurgården/Älvsjö 
 Damallsvenskan (2): 2003, 2004
 Svenska Cupen (2):2004, 2005

Individual 
 Damallsvenskan top scorers: 1998, 2001, 2003
 2003 FIFA Women's World Cup Silver Ball
 2003 FIFA Women's World Cup All star team
 Best female player in Sweden (Diamantbollen) (2): 1998, 2003
Fotbollsgalan 1997
 Breakthrough of the Year
Fotbollsgalan 1998
 Diamantbollen: Best female player in Sweden 1998
Fotbollsgalan 2003
 Diamantbollen: Best female player in Sweden 2003
 Best female striker in Sweden 2003
Fotbollsgalan 2004
 Best female striker in Sweden 2004

International tournaments with the national team

FIFA Women's World Cup 1999: Quarter-final
FIFA Women's World Cup 2003: Runner-up  
FIFA Women's World Cup 2007: Group stage
2000 Summer Olympics in Sydney: Group stage
2004 Summer Olympics in Athens: Fourth place
2008 Summer Olympics in Beijing: Quarter-final
UEFA Women's Euro 1997: Semi-finals
UEFA Women's Euro 2001: Runner-up 
UEFA Women's Euro 2005: Semi-finals
UEFA Women's Euro 2009: Quarter-final
Algarve Cup (Participated from 1997 to 2009): Winner 2001, 2009
Four Nations Tournament: Fourth Place 1998, Third Place 2004
Australia Cup: Runner-up 2000, Winner 2003

International tournaments with the national team U-20
 Nordic Cup: Winner 1994

International tournaments with the national team U-16
 Nordic Cup: Winner 1993

Footnotes

References

Match reports

External links
Profile at SvFF 

1977 births
Living people
FIFA Century Club
Footballers at the 2000 Summer Olympics
Footballers at the 2004 Summer Olympics
Footballers at the 2008 Summer Olympics
Lesbian sportswomen
LGBT association football players
Swedish LGBT sportspeople
Olympic footballers of Sweden
Sweden women's international footballers
Swedish women's footballers
People from Borås
Women's association football forwards
Djurgårdens IF Fotboll (women) players
2007 FIFA Women's World Cup players
2003 FIFA Women's World Cup players
1999 FIFA Women's World Cup players
Sportspeople from Västra Götaland County